The 1898 Ursinus football team was an American football team that represented Ursinus College during the 1898 college football season. The team compiled a 7–2–1 record and outscored opponents by a total of 214 to 46. Harry Off was the head coach.

Schedule

References

Ursinus
Ursinus Bears football seasons
Ursinus football